David Drok (23 May 1914 – 7 March 2002) was a Dutch football forward who played for the Netherlands in the 1938 FIFA World Cup.

Club career
He played for hometown clubs RFC Rotterdam and Sparta Rotterdam.

International career
Drok made his debut for the Netherlands in a February 1935 friendly match against Germany and earned a total number of 8 caps, scoring 4 goals. His final international was in March 1940 against Luxembourg.

References

External links
 
 FIFA profile

1914 births
2002 deaths
Footballers from Rotterdam
Dutch footballers
Netherlands international footballers
1938 FIFA World Cup players
Association football forwards
Sparta Rotterdam players
SC Emma managers
Dutch football managers